Authoring may refer to:
 Writing, as by an author
 Authoring systems, computer based systems that allow the creation of content for intelligent tutoring systems
 Optical disc authoring and DVD authoring, the process of creating a DVD or a CD from multimedia source materials.